The 2004 OFC Nations Cup Final was the final match of the 2004 OFC Nations Cup between Solomon Islands and Australia. It was a two-legged final held on 9 and 12 October in Honiara and Sydney respectively. Australia won the first leg 5-1 and the second 6-0 to win the competition 11-1 on aggregate. Australia won the right to play in the 2005 FIFA Confederations Cup as the representative from the OFC.

Match

First leg

Notes
The Solomon Islands line-up is disputed for this match and may not be entirely correct.

Second leg

References

OFC Nations Cup Finals
OFC
OFC
Final
October 2004 sports events in Oceania
October 2004 sports events in Australia